Erebia jeniseiensis  is a  butterfly found in the East  Palearctic (Altai, Tuva, North Mongolia, South Siberia,Sakhalin, Magadan region) that belongs to the browns family. E. jeniseiensis Trybom (= velox Herz) is distributed in Central and North-East Siberia, is a form [of E. euryale] in which the black dots are thinly edged with russet-yellow. The hindwing above is mostly without markings, bearing beneath a narrow white band.

See also
List of butterflies of Russia

References

External links
 Images representing Erebia jeniseiensis at Barcodes of Life

Satyrinae
Taxa named by Filip Trybom